is a Japanese cooking manga written and illustrated by Tetsuji Sekiya. The manga has been serialized in Shogakukan's seinen magazine (aimed at older men) Big Comic Spirits. As of February 2009, Shogakukan has published 14 tankōbon of the manga. It received the 2008 Shogakukan Manga Award for seinen/general manga along with Takeshi Natsuhara's and Kuromaru's Kurosagi.

Nippon Television broadcast the live-action TV drama from April 18, 2007 to June 27, 2007. It was broadcast in the United States, Canada and Puerto Rico by TV Japan, an affiliate of NHK, from January to March 2008.

Media

Manga
Bambino! is written and illustrated by Tetsuji Sekiya. It was serialized in Shogakukan's seinen magazine (aimed at older men) Big Comic Spirits. As of March 2009, Shogakukan has published 14 bound volumes of the manga between March 30, 2005 and December 26, 2008.

Volume listing

Drama
"We Can Make It!" by Arashi is the series' opening theme song.

Cast
Jun Matsumoto as Shogo Ban
Masachika Ichimura as Tekkan Shishido (chef and the owner of Trattoria Baccanale)
Yuki Uchida as Miyuki Shishido (manager and a daughter of Tekkan)
Kuranosuke Sasaki as Atsushi Kuwahara (souschef)
Ryuta Sato as Nozomi Katori (pasta chef)
Karina as Asuka Hibino (chef for antipastos)
Osamu Mukai as Masashi Senoo (apprentice chef)
Hosshan as Toshio Oda (pastry chef)
Kazuki Kitamura as Tsukasa Yonamine/ Yona-san (chief of waiters)
Ayaka Komatsu as Kozue Minagawa (waitress, became an assistant chef later)
Sasaki Takao as Nagai Hirokazu (waiter & sommelier)
Sato Yusuke as Takanashi Hiroshi (waiter)
Aso Kosuke as Shibata Kenichiro (waiter)
Kei Yamamoto as Susumu Shindō (chef and the owner of Trattoria San Marzano, which Shogo used to work for in Hakata, Fukuoka)
Kazue Fukiishi as Eri Takahashi (Shogo's girlfriend)
Kimiko Yo as Satoko Ban (mother of Shogo)
Keiko Toda as Kyōko Nogami (one of steady patrons for Baccanale)
Hiroyuki Ikeuchi as Yasuhide Hayama (former chef of Baccanale and Asuka's boyfriend)

Title listing

Soundtrack CD
On March 30, 2007, wint released a soundtrack CD for the Bambino! TV drama.

Reception
The Bambino! manga received the 2008 Shogakukan Manga Award for seinen/general manga along with Takeshi Natsuhara's and Kuromaru's Kurosagi.

At the 53rd Television Drama Academy Awards, the Bambino! television drama was awarded four prizes. They were: Best Actor (Jun Matsumoto), Supporting Actor (Kitamura Kazuki), Best Director and Special Award.

References

2005 manga
2007 Japanese television series debuts
2007 Japanese television series endings
2009 manga
2012 comics endings
Cooking in anime and manga
Japanese television dramas based on manga
Manga adapted into television series
Nippon TV dramas
Television shows written by Yoshikazu Okada
Seinen manga
Shogakukan manga
Winners of the Shogakukan Manga Award for general manga